Wild Cowboys is the debut solo studio album by American rapper Sadat X of Brand Nubian. It was released on July 15, 1996 via Loud Records. Recording sessions took place at Chung King Studios, at D&D Studios, at Platinum Island Studios and at Greene St. Recording in New York, and at Chris Biondo Studios in Washington, D.C. Production was handled by Diamond D, Buckwild, DJ Ogee, Ali Malek, Ant Greene Father Time, Da Beatminerz, Dante Ross, DJ Alamo, Minnesota, Pete Rock, Showbiz and Sadat X himself. It features guest appearances from Shawn Black, DV Alias Khrist, Deda, Grand Puba, Kool Chuck, Money Boss Players, Tec, Sha Sha and Regina Hall. The album peaked at number 83 on the Billboard 200 and number 13 on the Top R&B/Hip-Hop Albums.

Though the album did not receive much mainstream attention, it was a popular underground release, partly due to the album's production. Wild Cowboys spawned two singles: "Hang 'Em High" b/w "Stages & Lights", which made it to #98 on the Billboard Hot 100,  and "The Lump Lump", which reached #85 on the Hot R&B/Hip-Hop Songs and #20 on the Hot Rap Songs.

A sequel to the album, Wild Cowboys II, was released on March 23, 2010.

Track listing

Sample credits
Track 1 contains samples from "Tell Me" written by Bryce Wilson and Amel Larrieux and performed by Groove Theory
Track 4 contains samples from "Invitation" written by Bronisław Kaper and Paul Francis Webster and performed by Cal Tjader
Track 5 embodies portions of "The Good, The Bad & The Ugly" written by Ennio Morricone
Track 7 contains samples from "Standing Right Here" written by Gene McFadden, John Whitehead and Victor Carstarphen and performed by Melba Moore
Track 13 contains excerpts from "Lovin' You" performed by Minnie Ripperton

Personnel

Derek "Sadat X" Murphy – main artist, producer (track 13), executive producer, sleeve notes
Shawn "Shawn Black" Hector – featured artist (tracks: 3, 8, 9, 15)
Maxwell "Grand Puba" Dixon – featured artist (track 4)
Kenneth "DV Alias Khtist" Scranton – featured artist (tracks: 5, 8)
Eddie "Eddie Cheeba" Faison – featured artist (track 7)
Sean "Lord Tariq" Hamilton – featured artist (track 7)
Mark "Minnesota" Richardson – featured artist (track 7), producer (track 6)
Sha Sha – vocals (track 7)
Regina Hall – featured artist (track 10)
Sylvester "Deda" James – featured artist (track 14)
Kool Chuck – featured artist (track 15)
Tec – featured artist (track 15)
Anthony "Roc Raida" Williams – scratches (track 1)
Anthony "Tone The Backbone" Scott – bass (track 10)
Tim Latham – mixing (track 1)
John Wydrycs – recording (track 1)
Gordon "Commissioner Gordon" Williams – mixing (tracks: 2, 11, 13), recording (tracks: 2, 13)
Tony Smalios – mixing (tracks: 3-5, 8-9, 15)
Chris Conway – recording (tracks: 3, 11, 15)
Jack Hersca – recording (tracks: 4, 9, 12), mixing (track 12)
Chris Biondo – recording (track 5)
Troy Hightower – mixing (tracks: 6, 7)
Ken "Duro" Ifill – recording (tracks: 6, 7)
Mario Rodriguez – recording (track 8)
Leo "Swift" Morris – mixing & recording (track 10)
James Wilson Staub – mixing & recording (track 14)
Tom Coyne – mastering
Anthony "Buckwild" Best – producer (tracks: 1, 8)
Joseph "Diamond D" Kirkland – producer (tracks: 2, 9, 12), additional programming (track 5)
Gary "DJ Ogee" Scott – producer (tracks: 3, 15)
Keith "Alamo" Jones – producer (track 4)
Ali Malek – producer (track 5)
Ant Greene Father Time – producer (track 7)
Ewart "DJ Evil Dee" Dewgarde – producer (track 10)
Walter "Mr. Walt" Dewgarde – producer (track 10)
Rodney "Showbiz" LeMay – producer (track 11)
Dante Ross – producer (track 13), executive producer, management
Peter "Pete Rock" Phillips – producer (track 14)
Matteo "Matt Life" Glen – executive producer, A&R
Schott "Schott Free" Jacobs – executive producer, A&R
Ola Kudu – art direction, design
Danny Clinch – photography

Charts

Singles chart positions

References

External links

Sadat X albums
1996 debut albums
RCA Records albums
Loud Records albums
Albums produced by Buckwild
Albums produced by Pete Rock
Albums produced by Diamond D
Albums produced by Dante Ross
Albums produced by Da Beatminerz
Albums produced by Showbiz (producer)
Albums recorded at Chung King Studios
Albums recorded at Greene St. Recording